Asandhimitta is a 2019 Sri Lankan Sinhala drama thriller film directed by Asoka Handagama and produced by H.D. Premasiri for Cine Sarasavi Films. It stars Nilmini Sigera and Dharmapriya Dias in lead roles along with W. Jayasiri and Shyam Fernando. Music composed by Kapila Poogalaarachchi.

The first special screening was held at Regal Cinema, Colombo.

Plot
A film director receives a telephone call from Asandhimiththa. She requests him to make a movie with her life story. She asks film director to give her an appointment to tell her story. The scene shifts to a bus where Asandhimitta and a young Wickramasekara are seated next to each other. Wickamasekara gives her sexual hints to insist her that he is willing to start a relationship with him. He gets down from the same place where Asandhimitta gets down and becomes her paramour. The story progresses with some hints alluding to the docile nature of Wickramasekara who tries to fit himself into the role of a house-husband. Asandhimitta is a ticket collector at a parking lot and she is subjected to ridiculous remarks of her obese body and her massive weight of 303 lb (137.5 kg). Asandhimitta loses her job and tries to do several odd jobs like exorcist, however she fails. Then she puts an advertisement in an newspaper mentioning that she is going to start an association for helpless women. She and Wickramasekara visit an apparently rich family including two ladies named Madara and Samadara and Wickramasekara tries to deceive the divorced lady in that family. The film reaches its climax when Wickramasinghe strangled the ladies. Asandhimitta is arrested by the police in connection to these three murders and director tried to locate Wickramasekara alian Wicky with the help of Pradeep the landlord of Asandhimitta's house. At the end of the film the audience is informed that Wickramasera is a hallucination of Asandhimitta and the two male character are the younger and older version of the same character. The film ends with the juxtaposition of director cutting his birthday cake with Asandhimitta raised to a noose to execute death penalty by prison officers.

Cast
 Nilmini Sigera as Asandhimitta
 Dharmapriya Dias as Wickramasekara aka Wicky
 W. Jayasiri as Old Wicky
 Shyam Fernando as Film director
 Gayani Gisanthika as Madhaara
 Sandali Handagama as Samadara
 Rukmal Nirosh as Lal
 Pradeep Ramawickrama as Bus conductor
 Anula Bulathsinhala as Old lady
 Yashoda Wimaladharma as Vasanthi
 Rithika Kodithuwakku as Girl in bus
 Widath Weerakon as Eka
 Ahas Dissanayake as Deka
 Shala Amarasuriya as Wicky's wife

International screening
The film has contested in many worldwide film festivals for award categories and international screenings. Special screening of the film in Sri Lanka was held in February 2019 at Tharangani film hall, Colombo. The film has been screened at Jogja-Netpac Asian Film Festival 2019 within Asian Perspectives non-competitive category.

 23rd Busan International Film Festival - nominated for Kim Jiseok Award.
 22nd Talin Black Knights Film Festival

References

External links
 
 අසන්ධිමිත්තා සමඟ සිනමා වැඩසටහනක්

2010s Sinhala-language films
2019 films
2019 thriller drama films
Sri Lankan thriller drama films
2019 drama films